Walkability is a term for planning concepts best understood by the mixed-use of amenities in high-density neighborhoods where people can access said amenities by foot. It is based on the idea that urban spaces should be more than just transport corridors designed for maximum vehicle throughput. Instead, it should be relatively complete livable spaces that serve a variety of uses, users, and transportation modes and reduce the need for cars for travel.

The term 'walkability' was primarily invented in the 1960s due to Jane Jacobs' revolution in urban studies. In recent years, walkability has become popular because of its health, economic, and environmental benefits. It is an essential concept of sustainable urban design. Factors influencing walkability include the presence or absence and quality of footpaths, sidewalks or other pedestrian rights-of-way, traffic and road conditions, land use patterns, building accessibility, and safety, among others.

Factors 

One proposed definition for walkability is: "The extent to which the built environment is friendly to the presence of people living, shopping, visiting, enjoying or spending time in an area". Walkability relies on the interdependencies between density, mix, and access in synergy. The urban DMA (Density, Mix, Access) is a set of synergies between the ways cities concentrate people and buildings, how they mix different people and activities, and the access networks used to navigate through them. These factors cannot be taken singularly. Rather than an ideal functional mix, there is a mix of mixes and interdependencies between formal, social, and functional mixes. Likewise, walk-able access cannot be reduced to any singular measure of connectivity, permeability, or catchment but is dependent on destinations and geared to metropolitan access through public transit nodes. While DMA is based on walkability measures, popular‘ walk score’ or ‘rate mystreet’ websites offer more metrics to connect urban morphology with better environmental and health outcomes.

Density 
Density is an interrelated assemblage of buildings, populations, and street life. It is a crucial property of walkability because it concentrates more people and places within walkable distances. There is difficulty determining density due to populations oscillating from the suburbs to the urban center. Moreover, measures of density can differ dramatically for different morphologies and building typologies. Density may be conflated with building height, contributing to the confusion. The ratio between the floor area and the site area is generally known as the Floor Area Ratio (FAR, also called Plot Ratio and Floor Space Index). For example, a ten-story building on 10% of the site has the same floor area as a single-story building with 100% site coverage. Secondly, the measure of dwellings/hectare is common but particularly blunt. It depends on the functional mix, household size, and dwelling size in relation to building or population densities. Larger houses will produce higher building densities for the same population, and larger households will lead to higher populations for the same number of dwellings. In functionally mixed neighborhoods, housing will be just one component of the mix and therefore not a measure of building or population density. The census-based density of residents/hectare is another common measure, but it does not include those who work there.

Functional mix 
Functional mix, like density, shortens the distances between wherever we are and where we need to be. The live/work/visit triangle constructs a field of possible relations between three primary functions that resonate with what economists have often called reproduction, production, and exchange (incorporating social exchange). They also identify primary relations between people and urban space – we become ‘residents,’ ‘workers,’ and ‘visitors,’ respectively, in different locations in everyday life. The key shift here lies in focusing on the mix rather than their functions. Such mapping offers an empirical understanding of the mix that enables us to expose different kinds and levels of a mix. It is tempting to construct an index for an ideal mix measured by the degree of lightness as the mix approaches the center of the triangle. However, we suggest that the best cities comprise a mix of mixes. Our attention should focus instead on the corners of the triangle – the dysfunctional parts of cities where one can- not walk between living, work, and visiting functions.

While the functional mix is crucial to any approach to walkability, it is important to note here that function is itself but one dimension of the urban mix, including the formal and social mix. A formal mix emerges from how a city produces different plot sizes, which are linked to different building styles, floor plate sizes, and building heights. While a small-grain urban fabric is linked to a more mixed neighborhood, large grains also need because some functions rely on those large grains to become part of the mix. The social mix has to do with how a good city brings together people of different ages, abilities, ethnicities, and social classes. Cities are places where differences rub together in walkable public spaces, and this mix of differences is fundamental to the production of urban vitality. Again, there is no single index for mix in its impact on walkability. The concept is fundamentally relational, both between functions and the formal and social mix sustaining them.

Access networks 

The access networks of a city enable and constrain pedestrian flows; it is the capacity or possibility to walk. Like density and mix, these are properties embodied in urban form and facilitate more efficient pedestrian flows. Access networks are also multi-modal and need to be understood from the perspective of those who choose between modes of walking, cycling, public transport, and cars. Public transport trips are generally coupled with walkable access to the transit stop. Walking will primarily be chosen for up to 10 minutes if it is the fastest mode and other factors are equal. Walking has the advantage that it is a much more predictable trip time than public transport or cars, where we have to allow for delays caused by poor service, congestion, and parking. Major infrastructural factors include access to mass transit, presence and quality of footpaths, buffers to moving traffic (planter strips, on-street parking or bike lanes) and pedestrian crossings, aesthetics, nearby local destinations, air quality, shade or sun in appropriate seasons, street furniture, traffic volume and speed. and wind conditions. Walkability is also examined based on the surrounding built environment. Reid Ewing and Robert Cervero's five D's of the built environment—density, diversity, design, destination accessibility, and distance to transit—heavily influence an area's walkability. Combinations of these factors influence an individual's decision to walk.

History 

Before cars and bicycles were mass-produced, walking was the main way to travel. It was the only way to get from place to place for much of human history. In the 1930s, economic growth led to increased automobile manufacturing. Cars were also becoming more affordable, leading to the rise of the automobile during the Post–World War II economic expansion. The detrimental effects of automobile emissions soon led to public concern over pollution.  Alternatives, including improved public transportation and walking infrastructure, have attracted more attention from planners and policymakers. There is a correlation between the white exodus from racially mixed urban regions to more racially homogeneous suburban regions with the growth of an automobile centric urban planning. Jane Jacobs The Death and Life of Great American Cities remains one of the most influential books in the history of American city planning especially concerning the future developments of the walkability concept. She coined the terms "social capital", "mixed primary uses", and "eyes on the street", which were adopted professionally in urban design, sociology, and many other fields. While there has been a push towards better walkability in cities in recent years, there are still many obstacles that need to be cleared to achieve more complete and cohesive communities where residents won't have to travel as far to get to where they need to go. For example, the average time it has taken American commuters to get to work has actually increased from 25 to 27.6 minutes, so much is still to be done if walkability is to be realized and a lessened reliance on cars comes into fruition.

Benefits

Health

Walkability indices have been found to correlate with both Body Mass Index (BMI) and physical activity of local populations. Physical activity can prevent chronic diseases, such as cardiovascular disease, diabetes, hypertension, obesity, depression, and osteoporosis. Thus for instance, an increase in neighborhood Walk Score has linked with both better Cardio metabolic risk profiles  and a decreased risk of heart-attacks. The World Cancer Research Fund and American Institute for Cancer Research released a report that new developments should be designed to encourage walking, on the grounds that walking contributes to a reduction of cancer. A further justification for walkability is founded upon evolutionary and philosophical grounds, contending that gait is important to the cerebral development in humans.

Due to discrepancies between residents' health in inner city neighborhoods and suburban neighborhoods with similar walkability measures, further research is needed to find additional built environment factors in walkability indices.

Socioeconomic

Walkability has also been found to have many socioeconomic benefits, including accessibility, cost savings both to individuals and to the public, student transport (which can include walking buses), increased efficiency of land use, increased livability, economic benefits from improved public health, and economic development, among others. The benefits of walkability are best guaranteed if the entire system of public corridors is walkable - not limited to certain specialized routes. More sidewalks and increased walkability can promote tourism and increase property value.

In recent years, the demand for housing in a walkable urban context has increased. The term "Missing Middle Housing" as coined by Daniel Parolek of Opticos Design, Inc., refers to multi-unit housing types (such as duplexes, fourplexes, bungalow courts, and mansion apartments not bigger than a large house), which are integrated throughout most walkable Pre-1940s neighborhoods, but became much less common after World War II, hence the term "missing." These housing types are often integrated into blocks with primarily single-family homes, to provide diverse housing choices and generate enough density to support transit and locally-serving commercial amenities.

Auto-focused street design diminishes walking and needed "eyes on the street" provided by the steady presence of people in an area. Walkability increases social interaction, mixing of populations, the average number of friends and associates where people live, reduced crime (with more people walking and watching over neighborhoods, open space and main streets), increased sense of pride, and increased volunteerism.

Socioeconomic factors contribute to willingness to choose walking over driving. Income, age, race, ethnicity, education, household status, and having children in a household all influence walking travel.

Environmental 
One of benefits of improving walkability is the decrease of the automobile footprint in the community. Carbon emissions can be reduced if more people choose to walk rather than drive or use public transportation, so proponents of walkable cities describe improving walkability as an important tool for adapting cities to climate change. The benefits of less emissions include improved health conditions and quality of life, less smog, and less of a contribution to global climate change. Further, cities that developed under guiding philosophies like walkability typically see lower levels of noise pollution in their neighborhoods. This goes beyond just making quieter communities to live, less noise pollution can also mean greater biodiversity. Studies have shown that noise pollution can disrupt certain senses that animals rely on to find food, reproduce, avoid predators, etc. which can weaken ecosystems in an already human dominated environment.   Society depends on these ecosystem for many ecological services such as provisioning, regulation, cultural/tourism, and supporting services  and any degradation of these services can go beyond just affecting the aesthetic of a neighborhood or community but can have serious implications for livability and wellbeing on entire regions.

Cities that have a relatively walkability score also tend to have a higher concentration of green spaces which facilitate a more walkable city. These green spaces can assist in regulatory ecological services such as flooding, improving the quality of both air and water, carbon sequestration, etc. all while also improving the attractiveness of the city or town in which it's implemented in.

Increasing walkability

Many communities have embraced pedestrian mobility as an alternative to older building practices that favor automobiles. This shift includes a belief that dependency on cars is ecologically unsustainable. Automobile-oriented environments engender dangerous conditions for motorists and pedestrians and are generally bereft of aesthetics. A type of zoning called Form-based coding  is a tool that some American cities, like Cincinnati, are employing to improve walkability. The COVID-19 pandemic gave birth to proposals for radical change in the organization of the town, in particular Barcelona, being the elimination of the car and consequent pedestrianization of the whole city one of the critical elements, and proposing an inversion of the concept of the sidewalk.

There are several ways to make a community more walkable:

 Buffers: Vegetation buffers as grass areas between the street and the sidewalk also make sidewalks safer and also absorbs the carbon dioxide from automobile emissions and assists with water drainage.
 Moving obstructions: removing signposts and utility poles, can increase the walkable width of the sidewalk. Quality maintenance and proper sidewalks lighting reduce obstructions, improve safety, and encourage walking.
 Sidewalk gaps: Sidewalks can be implemented where there are "sidewalk gaps," with priority to areas where walking is encouraged, such as around schools or transit stations. Campaigns such as Atlanta, Georgia's safe transit routes provide safer access to transit stops for pedestrians. There are several aspects to consider when implementing new sidewalks, such as sidewalk width. The Americans with Disabilities Act (ADA) requires that sidewalks be at least five feet in width.
 Pedestrian zone: New infrastructure and pedestrian zones replace roads for better walkability. Cities undertake pedestrian projects for better traffic flow by closing automobile access and only allowing pedestrians to travel. Projects such as the High Line and the 606 Trail increase walkability by connecting neighborhoods, using landscape architectural elements to create visually aesthetic green space and allowing for physical activity. Towns can also be modified to be pedestrian villages.
 Curb extensions: Curb extensions decrease the radii of the corners of the curb at intersections, calm traffic, and reduce the distance pedestrians have to cross. On streets with parking, curb extensions allow pedestrians to see oncoming traffic better where they otherwise would be forced to walk into the street to see past parked cars. Striped crosswalks, or zebra crossings, also provide safer crossings because they provide better visibility for both drivers and pedestrians.Improving crosswalk safety also increases walkability.
 Improving safety: Monitoring and improving safety in neighborhoods can make walking a more attractive option. Safety is the primary concern among children when choosing how to get to and from school. Ensuring safer walking areas by keeping paths well-maintained and well-lit can encourage walkability.
 Work from home: working from home completely eliminates any travel time associated with work and allows for people to use the time spent commuting, an average of 27.6 minutes in America. An increase in people working from home in recent years after the COVID 19 pandemic not only has cut down on fossil fuels burned, but also has other benefits like improving productivity.

Measuring 
One way of assessing and measuring walkability is to undertake a walking audit. An established and widely used walking audit tool is PERS (Pedestrian Environment Review System) which has been used extensively in the UK.

A simple way to determine the walkability of a block, corridor or neighborhood is to count the number of people walking, lingering and engaging in optional activities within a space.  This process is a vast improvement upon pedestrian level of service (LOS) indicators, recommended within the Highway Capacity Manual. However it may not translate well to non-Western locations where the idea of "optional" activities may be different. In any case, the diversity of people, and especially the presence of children, seniors and people with disabilities, denotes the quality, completeness and health of a walkable space.

A number of commercial walkability scores also exist:
 Walk Score is a walkability index based on the distance to amenities such as grocery stores, schools, parks, libraries, restaurants, and coffee shops. Walk Score's algorithm awards maximum points to amenities within 5 minutes' walk (.25 mi), and a decay function assigns points for amenities up to 30 minutes away. Scores are normalized from 0 to 100.
 Walkonomics was a web app that combines open data and crowdsourcing to rate and review the walkability of each street. As of 2011, Walkonomics claimed to have ratings for every street in England (over 600,000 streets) and New York City., although it stopped service in 2018.
 RateMyStreet is a website that uses crowdsourcing, Google Maps and a five star rating system to allow users to rate the walkability of their local streets. Users can rate a street using eight different categories: Crossing the street, pavement/sidewalk width, trip hazards, wayfinding, safety from crime, road safety, cleanliness/attractiveness, and disabled peoples' access.

Mapping
A newly developing concept is the transit time map (sometimes called a transit shed map), which is a type of isochrone map.  These are maps (often online and interactive) that display the areas of a metropolis which can be reached from a given starting point, in a given amount of travel time. Such maps are useful for evaluating how well-connected a given address is to other possible urban destinations, or conversely, how large a territory can quickly get to a given address. The calculation of transit time maps is computationally intensive, and considerable work is being done on more efficient algorithms for quickly producing such maps. To be useful, the production of a transit time map must take into consideration detailed transit schedules, service frequency, time of day, and day of week. Moreover, the recent development of computer vision and street view imagery has provided significant potential to automatically assess spaces for pedestrians from the ground level.

See also 

Alley

Forced rider
Form-based code
Free-range parenting
Greening

International charter for walking
Jaywalking

Missing Middle Housing
New Urbanism

Permeability (spatial and transport planning)

Trail ethics

Walking
Walking audit
Walking bus
Walking distance measure
Walking tour

References

Further reading
Dovey, Kim & Pafka, Elek (2019). "What is walkability? The urban DMA", Urban Studies.
Leyden, Kevin M. (2003). "Social Capital and the Built Environment: The Importance of Walkable Neighborhoods." American Journal of Public Health. Volume 93: 1546-1551
Speck, Jeff. (2012). Walkable City: How Downtown Can Save America, One Step at a Time. Macmillan.

External links
levelofservice.com, Walkability tools research and walking level of service calculator.
Walkshed.org, an online walkability mapping application using personal preferences.
walkscore.com/, an online tool that maps walk-scores, a walkability index that is based on a number of measurable variables.

Urban studies and planning terminology
Sustainable transport
Pedestrian infrastructure